Barsola Kalan is a village located in Nighasan Tahsil of Lakhimpur Kheri district in the Indian state of Uttar Pradesh.

Geography
Barsola Kalan is very close to the boundary of Nepal, and residents have easy access to Nepal. Barsola Kalan (Tikunia) is 188 km. from the state capital Lucknow and 84.4 km from Lakhimpur Kheri. Barsola Kalan can be reached by road following State Highway 21 (SH21). Nearest railway station is Tikunia railway station and village can be easily reached by train (meter gauge) or UPSRTC Bus services.

Barsola Kalan is one of the villages in Tikunia, which is further divided into chotta Barsola and bada Barsola.

External links
 Gurudwara Kaudiyala Ghat Sahib, Tikunia Kheri

References

Villages in Lakhimpur Kheri district